The Men's 20 km Walk at the 1999 World Championships in Sevilla, Spain was held on Saturday 21 August 1999, with the start at 18:45h local time.

Medalists

Abbreviations
All times shown are in hours:minutes:seconds

Records

Startlist

Intermediates

Final ranking

See also
1999 Race Walking Year Ranking

References
 Results
 IAAF results
 trackandfieldnews
 Die Leichtathletik-Statistik-Seite

H
Racewalking at the World Athletics Championships